The fourteenth series of the British medical drama television series Holby City began airing in the United Kingdom on BBC One on 18 October 2011 and concluded on 9 December 2012. The series ran for 52 episodes.

Episodes

Production
The series is produced by the BBC and will air on BBC One in the United Kingdom. Johnathan Young is the executive producer, having succeeded Belinda Campbell during series thirteen.

Cast

Overview 
All 16 main characters from series thirteen initially returned - consultant cardiothoracic surgeons Elliot Hope (Paul Bradley) and Jac Naylor (Rosie Marcel), consultant general surgeons Henrik Hanssen (Guy Henry), Ric Griffin (Hugh Quarshie) and Michael Spence (Hari Dhillon), consultant orthopaedic surgeon Dan Hamilton (Adam Astill), cardiothoracic surgical registrars Sahira Shah (Laila Rouass) and Greg Douglas (Edward MacLiam), general surgical registrars Antoine Malick (Jimmy Akingbola) and Sacha Levy (Bob Barrett), Foundation Training 2 doctor Oliver Valentine (James Anderson), Foundation Training 1 doctor Frieda Petrenko (Olga Fedori), senior nurse Eddi McKee (Sarah-Jane Potts), ward sister Chrissie Williams (Tina Hobley), staff nurse Elizabeth Tait (La Charné Jolly) and agency nurse Chantelle Lane (Lauren Drummond).

In November 2011, Joseph Millson was introduced as AAU's new trauma registrar Luc Hemingway. Millson described the character as someone who "winds everybody up" without realising that he is doing so. Young expanded, "Luc is an enigmatic stranger whose diagnostic genius and acerbic wit make him a brilliant doctor but an occasionally infuriating colleague. Joseph's created an intriguing, complex and riveting character who will most definitely bring a new dimension to the AAU ward." New Foundation Training 1 doctor Tara Lo (Jing Lusi) joined the show on 6 March 2012, followed by the introduction of experienced consultant general surgeon Serena Campbell (Catherine Russell), nurse and transplant co-ordinator Jonny Maconie (Michael Thomson) and cardiothoracic registrar Mo Effanga (Chizzy Akudolu) in May 2012.

Several cast members have departed since the beginning of Series 14. Jolly left the show on 25 October 2011 when her character was written out of the show. On 21 October 2011, Rouass announced her intention to leave the show to spend more time with her family. Rouass final scenes will be aired in April or May 2012. On 12 December 2011, MacLiam announced his intention to also depart the series. Rouass departed from the series on 17 April 2012, with MacLiam following on 1 May 2012. Olga Fedori left her role as F2 Frieda Petrenko on 15 May 2012. On 17 May 2012, it was announced that Adam Astill would be leaving the show in July.

Recurring characters have included staff nurses Mary-Claire Carter (Niamh McGrady) and Lleucu Jones (Daisy Keeping), consultant general surgeon and AAU clinical lead Alex Broadhurst (Sasha Behar), who appeared for six episodes in early 2012, and consultant anaesthetist Rafi Raza (Zubin Varla), husband of established character Sahira Shah, who was introduced as part of Laila Rouass' exit storyline.

Main characters 

Jimmy Akingbola as Antoine Malick
Chizzy Akudolu as Mo Effanga (from episode 32)
James Anderson as Oliver Valentine
Adam Astill as Dan Hamilton (until episode 39)
Bob Barrett as Sacha Levy
Paul Bradley as Elliot Hope
Hari Dhillon as Michael Spence
Lauren Drummond as Chantelle Lane

Guy Henry as Henrik Hanssen
Tina Hobley as Chrissie Williams

La Charné Jolly as Elizabeth Tait (until episode 2)
Jing Lusi as Tara Lo (from episode 21)
Rosie Marcel as Jac Naylor
Edward McLiam as Greg Douglas (until episode 29)
Joseph Millson as Luc Hemingway (episodes 3−37, from episode 49)
Sarah-Jane Potts as Eddi McKee
Hugh Quarshie as Ric Griffin
Laila Rouass as Sahira Shah (until episode 27)

Michael Thomson as Jonny Maconie (from episode 31)

Recurring and guest characters 
Sasha Behar as Alex Broadhurst (episodes 17−25)
Leander Deeny as George Binns (episodes 44−51)
Ben Hull as Derwood "Mr T" Thompson (from episode 38)
Daisy Keeping as Lleucu Jones (until episode 24)
John Light as Max Schneider (episodes 43−50)
Niamh McGrady as Mary-Claire Carter
Paul Nicholls as Simon Marshall (episodes 31−39)
Zubin Varla as Rafi Raza (episodes 19−27)

References
General

 Titles, credits, airdates and summaries: 
 Airdates and summaries: 
 Viewing figures: 

Specific

External links
. 

14
2011 British television seasons
2012 British television seasons